Karl Zwicky (born 16 November 1956) is Australian film director, producer and screenwriter.

Movies

Television series
Tricky Business (2012) (2 episodes)
Crownies (2011) (22 episodes)
Cops L.A.C. (2010) (4 episodes)
K-9 (2010) (5 episodes)
City Homicide (2009–2010) (4 episodes)
Home and Away (2009–2019) (69 episodes)
Neighbours (2008–2012) (16 episodes)
Farscape (2003) (1 episode)
Short Cuts (2002)
The Lost World (2002) (1 episode)
McLeod's Daughters (2001–2009) (163 episodes)
BeastMaster (2001) (1 episode)
Cushion Kids (2001) – Director
Fairy Tale Police Department (2001–2002) – Director
Hi-5 (1999) – Director
Medivac (1998) (1 episode)
All Saints (1998–2001) (4 episodes)
Driven Crazy (1998) – Director
Sweat (1996) (6 episodes)
Heartbreak High (1994–1999) (25 episodes)
Ship to Shore (1993) (6 episodes)
The Comedy Sale (1993) (3 episodes)
The New Adventures of Black Beauty (1992) (2 episodes)
Police Rescue (1991) (1 episode)
The Miraculous Mellops (1991–1992) (40 episodes)
The Flying Doctors (1990) (3 episodes)
Elly & Jools (1990) – Director
The Gerry Connolly Show (1988) (6 episodes)
Relative Merits (1987) – Director
Fame and Misfortune (1986) – Director
Sons and Daughters (1982–1983) (14 episodes)

Notes

External links
 

Australian film directors
Australian film producers
Living people
1956 births
English-language film directors
Australian screenwriters